Courtney "Cortz" Smith (born April 14, 1971 in Kingston, Jamaica) is a Canadian retired professional rugby player.

International
Played twice against All-Japan on Canada's Under 23 tour in 1993 and has since been to Europe and then to Fiji and New Zealand with Canada winning his first cap against the Uruguay in '95. Played against Japan and Hong Kong in Pac Rim '96 scoring a try against Japan. Scored two tries against the US in 1996 Pan Am. Suffered an unfortunate broken arm in first match of the Pac Rim '97 and missed further caps. Toured Ireland with Canada in Nov. 1997 and scored two tries for Rugby Canada in the Welsh Challenge Cup and three more in four Pac Rim tests in 1998.

Premier and club
Club rugby included Ontario Premiership rugby for Balmy Beach and the Meraloma Rugby club Premier Division for the Canadian Direct British Columbia's Premiership League.

External links
Old "official" Rugby Canada website players list
Official Cap list of Rugby Canada Note: have to type "courtney smith" in the "find" box

Notes

Canadian rugby union players
1971 births
Canadian sportspeople of Jamaican descent
Living people
Rugby union wings
Canada international rugby union players